Romāns Apsītis (13 February 1939 – February 2022) was a Latvian jurist and politician.

A member of the Latvian Way, he served in the Saeima from 1993 to 1998 and was Minister of Justice from 1994 to 1995. He died in February 2022, at the age of 83.

References

1939 births
2022 deaths
Politicians from Riga
Latvian Way politicians
Communist Party of Latvia politicians
Deputies of the 5th Saeima
Deputies of the 6th Saeima
Deputies of the Supreme Council of the Republic of Latvia
Ministers of Justice of Latvia
Judges of the Constitutional Court of Latvia
Latvian legal scholars
University of Latvia alumni
20th-century Latvian judges